Alexandra Agoston-O'Connor, known professionally as Alexandra Agoston, is an Australian fashion model.

Career
Agoston is of Hungarian, Irish, English, and Austrian descent. She was discovered in Paris while on holiday with her family.

Her first modelling jobs were for Proenza Schouler, Monique Lhuillier, Christian Lacroix, Elie Saab, Armani Privé, Dior, Comme des Garçons and Jean-Paul Gaultier. She's also walked for Naeem Khan, Badgley Mischka, John Galliano, Off-White, Christian Siriano, and David Jones.

She is considered to be Gaultier's muse.

Agoston has been the face of Kookai.

Personal life
Agoston is in a relationship with photographer Chris Colls.

References

Living people
1987 births
Australian female models
Australian people of Hungarian descent
Australian people of Irish descent
Australian people of English descent
Australian people of Austrian descent
Australian models of Irish descent
21st-century Australian women